Western Suburbs DRLFC may refer to:
Western Suburbs District Rugby League Football Club, the former name of the Western Suburbs Magpies of Sydney.
Western Suburbs District Rugby League Football Club, the former name of the Western Suburbs Panthers of Brisbane.